Kawakami (written: 川上) is a Japanese surname. Notable people with the surname include:

Bertha Kawakami (1931–2017), American educator and politician
, Japanese writer
Gensai Kawakami (1834–1871), a famous samurai
Hajime Kawakami (1879–1946), Japanese Marxist economist
Hiromi Kawakami (born 1958), a Japanese author
Juria Kawakami (born 1993), a Japanese singer
Kenji Kawakami (born 1946), the inventor of Chindōgu
Kenshin Kawakami (born 1975), a Japanese Major League Baseball pitcher
Kikuko Kawakami (1904–1985), a Japanese novelist
Kiyoshi Kawakami (nicknamed "Karl"; 1873–1949), a Japanese journalist and author
Masashi Kawakami (born 1972), a Japanese boxer
Mieko Kawakami (born 1976), a Japanese singer and author
Mine Kawakami (born 1969), Japanese pianist and composer
Otojirō Kawakami (1864–1911), a Japanese actor and theatrical manager
Richard Kawakami (1931–1987), American politician
Sadayakko Kawakami (1871–1946), a Japanese actress known professionally as Sada Yacco
Saena Kawakami (born 1997), Japanese badminton player
Takeshi Kawakami (born 1972), a Japanese professional shogi player
Tetsuharu Kawakami (1920–2013), Japanese baseball player "God of Batting/Hitting", and manager
Tim Kawakami, American sports journalist

Fictional characters
Momoyo Kawakami and Kazuko Kawakami in Maji de Watashi ni Koi Shinasai! (Majikoi ~ Oh! Samurai Girls)
Tomie Kawakami in Tomie 

Japanese-language surnames